Kenazaq (also Romanized as Kenāzaq; also known as Kenāzeh) is a village in Vilkij-e Shomali Rural District, in the Central District of Namin County, Ardabil Province, Iran. At the 2006 census, its population was 48, in 13 families.

References 

Towns and villages in Namin County